Erich Arndt may refer to:

 Erich Arndt (cyclist) (1911–1961), German cyclist
 Erich Arndt (table tennis) (born 1938), German table tennis player

See also
 Enzo Amore (Eric Arndt,  born 1986), American professional wrestler